Rhanterium is a genus of dwarf-shrubs in the tribe Inuleae within the family Asteraceae growing in the deserts of the Middle East and northern Africa.

 Species
 Rhanterium adpressum Coss. & Durieu - Morocco, Algeria
 Rhanterium epapposum Oliv. - Saudi Arabia, Oman, United Arab Emirates, Qatar, Bahrain, Kuwait, Iraq, Iran, Pakistan
 Rhanterium suaveolens Desf.  - Algeria, Libya, Tunisia

References

Inuleae
Asteraceae genera
Taxa named by René Louiche Desfontaines